Jane Elizabeth Mills is an Australian-New Zealand academic and as of 2020 is the Dean and Head, La Trobe Rural Health School, Bendigo, Victoria, Australia.

Academic career

After a 2006 PhD titled  'Australian rural nurses' experiences of mentoring : a constructivist grounded theory study'  at the Monash University, Mills moved to James Cook University, Cairns where she undertook a number of different roles before being promoted to Professor (Promotional Chair). After completing an MBA at Imperial College, London she moved to Massey University, as the Pro Vice Chancellor of the College of Health. Mills is currently employed at La Trobe University as the Dean and Head of the La Trobe Rural Health School. Mills remains an adjunct professor at both Massey University and James Cook University.

Mills' best known work relates to constructivist grounded theory and in particular her book with Professor Melanie Birks Grounded Theory a Practical Guide. Published by Sage, this text is considered to be one of the most contemporary guides to grounded theory methodology/methods and is widely used by higher degree research candidates.

Selected works 
 Birks, M., Hoare, K., & Mills, J. (2019). Grounded Theory: The FAQs. International Journal of Qualitative Methods, 18, 1609406919882535.
 Harrison, H., Birks, M., Franklin, R., & Mills, J. (2017). Case Study Research: Foundations and Methodological Orientations. Forum Qualitative Sozialforschung/Forum: Qualitative Social Research, 18(1).
 Birks, M., & Mills, J. (2015). Grounded Theory: a practical guide. London, UK: Sage Publications.
 Redman-MacLaren, M., & Mills, J. (2015). Transformational grounded theory: theory, voice, and action. International Journal of Qualitative Methods, 14, 1–12.
 Mills, J., & Birks, M. (2014). Qualitative Methodologies: a practical guide. London, UK: Sage.
 Redman-MacLaren, M., Mills, J., & Tommbe, R. (2014). Interpretive focus groups: a participatory method for interpreting and extending secondary analysis of qualitative data. Global Health Action, 7, 1–6.
 Nurjannah, I., Mills, J., Park, T., & Usher, K. (2014). Conducting a grounded theory study in a language other than English. SAGE Open, 4, 1–10.
 Chamberlain-Salaun, J., Mills, J., & Usher, K. (2013). Linking symbolic interactionism and grounded theory methods in a research design: from Corbin and Strauss' assumptions to action. SAGE Open, 3, 1–10.
 Whiteside, M., Mills, J., & McCalman, J. (2012). Using secondary data for grounded theory analysis. Australian Social Work, 65, 504–516.
 Hoare, K. J., Mills, J., & Francis, K. (2012). Sifting, sorting and saturating data in a grounded theory study of information use by practice nurses: a worked example. International Journal of Nursing Practice, 18, 582–588.
 Hoare, K. J., Mills, J., & Francis, K. (2012). Dancing with data: an example of acquiring theoretical sensitivity in a grounded theory study. International Journal of Nursing Practice, 18, 240–245.
 Birks, M., & Mills, J. (2011). Grounded Theory: a practical guide. London: Sage Publications.
 Mills, J., Birks, M., & Hegney, D. (2010). The status of rural nursing in Australia: 12 years on. Collegian, 17, 30–37.
 Birks, M., Mills, J., Francis, K., & Chapman, Y. (2009). A thousand words paint a picture: the use of storyline in grounded theory research. Journal of Research in Nursing, 14, 405–417.
 Mills, J., Chapman, Y., Bonner, A., & Francis, K. (2007). Grounded theory: a methodological spiral from positivism to postmodernism. Journal of Advanced Nursing, 58, 72–79.
 Mills, J., Bonner, A., & Francis, K. (2006). The development of constructivist grounded theory. International Journal of Qualitative Methods, 5, 25–35.
 Mills, J., Bonner, A., & Francis, K. (2006). Adopting a constructivist approach to grounded theory: implications for research design. International Journal of Nursing Practice, 12, 8–13.

References

External links
 
 
 
 Publications by Jane Mills, at Google Scholar 

Living people
Year of birth missing (living people)
Australian women academics
Monash University alumni
Alumni of Imperial College London
Academic staff of the Massey University
Academic staff of James Cook University
Academic staff of La Trobe University